Harry Grant may refer to:
Harry Grant (racing driver), American racing driver
Harry Grant (cyclist) (1906–1993), British racing cyclist
Harry Grant (footballer) (born 1993), English footballer
Bud Grant (Harry Peter Grant, born 1927), former American football head coach
Harry Grant (rugby league) (born 1998), Australian rugby league player

See also
Henry Grant (disambiguation)
Harold Grant (disambiguation)